Max Scheler (1874–1928) was an early 20th-century German Continental philosopher in the phenomenological tradition.  Scheler's style of phenomenology has been described by some scholars as “applied phenomenology”: an appeal to facts or “things in themselves” as always furnishing a descriptive basis for speculative philosophical concepts. One key source of just such a pattern of facts is expressed in Scheler’s descriptive mapping of human emotional life (the “Stratification of Emotional Life”) as articulated in his seminal 1913–1916 work, Formalism in Ethics and Non-Formal Ethics of Values.

Overview 

The practical significance of Scheler's Stratification of Emotional Life is obvious in several respects and points of view.

First, Scheler seems to be making a case in favor of what we might refer to today as Emotional Intelligence, as a portal to more ethical behavior and optimum personal development, similar to the ancient Greek concern for promoting virtuous character.  However quite unlike many of our modern attitudes and prejudices, emotional life ought not be viewed as simply a chaotic impediment to reason, but rather should be understood as a sort of “sixth sense” having an informative objective core: what Scheler termed our Ordo Amoris (or “Logic of the Heart”).

Second, for Scheler values have true primacy as real inherent qualities discovered in things, people, situations and the like. Values and immanent emotive experience are co-extensive: “the plain fact is that we act vis-à-vis values just as we do vis-à-vis colors and sounds.”  Scheler's claim is that the correlates of feelings and emotions are values, just as the correlates of visual perception are colors and audio perceptions are sounds. If such qualities are present in a person's world, they tend to be apprehended. But the reverse is also true: the meanings ascribed to things, people, situations and the like are uniquely co-extensive with the subjective relativity of every person, as the "totality of acts of different kinds"  having a unique qualitative direction  and destiny. As a value being and bearer of values every person is as unique as a snowflake. This is why Scheler's ethics is commonly referred as a Material Value-Ethics as opposed to a formal ethics (Immanuel Kant).

Third, values are emotively intuited. The whole of "something" is intuited by consciousness before any of the parts can fully be rationally known or assimilated. Common expressions such as "ah ha", "love at first sight," déjà vu or "the cat's pajamas" sum up this basic idea. Values are realized though personal apprehensions (i.e. "attractions" and "repulsions") of positive (and negative) qualities discoverable through our own pre-thought, pre-willed acts of preference.

Fourth, depth of emotion signals importance (intensity) of value, just as absence of feeling signals the lack. This depth structure found in emotive life correlates reciprocally to Scheler’s formulation of an upward vertical apriori hierarchy of values as forming the basis of an intuitive ethics inspired by love, emanating ultimately from the Divine.

Scheler's analysis of the strata of emotive life 
For Scheler, human feelings, feeling states and emotions display a meaningful and progressive pattern of levels from our peripheral to the deeper more stable structures of personality. Scheler identified four  distinct but interrelated strata found in human emotional life.

At our most periphery we have sensible feelings (e.g., a tickle, an itch, a fragrance, a taste, pleasure, pain, hunger, thirst, intoxication…), which manifest in relative modes of joy and suffering.  These feelings are shortest in duration, extended and localizable with reference to the lived-body, and are the most readily alterable and accessible through external means and stimuli.

Next we have vital feelings or feeling states of the unitary lived-body which are experienced as a unified field or whole (e.g., comfort, health, vigor, strength, tiredness, illness, weakness, advancing age, phantom limb phenomenon…), and which manifest intentionally as fear and hope.

The remaining two strata of the emotive map belongs to the realm of individual personhood because these emotions transcend (or at least exceed) the physical restrictions of lived-body and environment; they are the least subject to arbitrary alteration; and they are also by their very nature communicable and social in character.

These are, first, the purely psychic feeling states or emotions having a characteristically ego-quality (e.g., euphoria, happiness, sympathy, enjoyment, sadness, sorrow, anger, jealousy…), and which manifest intentionally as empathy, preferring, loving, hating and willing. As representing one’s prevalent mental disposition it is important to note that psychic feeling states are alterable though acts of free will, thought and positive social interactions.

Finally, Scheler identifies spiritual feelings which differ sharply from personal psychic feeling states in that “all ego-states seem to be extinguished… [and such emotions] take possession of the whole of our being.” (e.g., bliss, awe, wonder, catharsis, despair, shame, remorse, anxiety, pangs of conscience, grief…). These types of emotions overtake and overcome us, usually quite unexpectedly.  We can not reason or will to produce such spiritual feelings.  As positive experiences, we can only open our hearts and mind and hope that they find us.

The intentional arch of positive feelings and feeling states ultimately spans from the sensible to the spiritual, or from a sort of “hedonistic nihilism” to deeper levels of personal contentment. The opposite is true for negative feeling and feeling states.

The connection between emotive life and value modalities 
The structure of Scheler's stratification model of emotive life correlates to the inherent spectral type structure of value rankings, or what Scheler termed the  apriori hierarchy of value modalities. Our earlier analogy to color perception illustrates this point. Just as all colors we intuit (see) are derivative of the pure spectrum or hues as when pure ("white") light is refracted through a prism, so too all intuited (felt) values are derivative of the apriori hierarchy of value modalities as when Divine love is apprehended through a purely ordered heart (Ordo Amoris).

Scheler's claim is that these value modalities are  constant and unchanging throughout history, forming a basis for objective non-formal ethics.  From lowest to highest these modalities (with their respective positive and corresponding negative dis-value forms) are as follows: sensual values of the agreeable and the disagreeable; vital values of the noble and vulgar; mental (psychic) values of the beautiful and ugly, right and wrong and truth and falsehood; and finally values of the Holy and Unholy of the Divine and Idols.

                       

The logical implication of all the above is that human beings will naturally prefer a positive value (i.e., value situation) over a negative value (or dis-value), such as when life seems to tragically descend in a self-perpetuating spiral of negative emotions (envy, anger, jealousy, spite, hate, revenge)--a psycho-philosophical problematic termed Ressentiment. Furthermore, human beings will naturally prefer values of a higher ranking over those of a lower to the extent that they will invest time, work and sacrifice to order to attain them: for example, people will routinely defer a measure of immediate gratification in order to secure a child's education, their own retirement, etc.

Hence, the relativity of value experience transitions to the beginnings of an objective morality which ensures personal fulfillment and transcendence. Since all ethics must ultimately advise our decisions in some way, Scheler’s non-formal value-based ethics promises to potentially achieve this end through our cognitive understanding and channeling of the advance information offered through our emotive life.

Philosophy vs. psychology: a relation of synergy 
Critics and admirers alike find Scheler's ethics susceptible to flights of romanticism as "decisively canceling the normative character of ethical acts." No surprise since a non-formal ethics does not rely on a system of rules or principles, but only implicit suggestions.  More pragmatic applications of Scheler's principles might best be implemented under the controlled guidance of therapeutic psychology.

Scheler’s ideas are inspiring to anyone who shares a common philosophical belief in the fundamental value of persons and in developing each of us to our optimum potential. This is all the more true when we consider just what this might mean for a well-ordered free and democratic society.

However, extreme care should be taken not to assume Scheler’s philosophy is somehow based purely in some sort of progressive bottom-up psychology: for example, Abraham Maslow’s hierarchy of needs, Jean Piaget’s theory of cognitive development, or Lawrence Kohlberg’s Stages of Moral Development.  This is particularly important since Scheler’s relied extensively on hierarchical “stratification” models as a sort of general motif for his philosophy as a whole, as well as for a wide range of editorial topics.  In spite many striking content similarities with scientific psychological theories, Scheler’s philosophy is, by contrast, first and foremost a serviceable speculative top-down emanation model, guided by love and values, and based upon dualistic metaphysical principals  of Vital Urge (Drang) and Spirit (Geist).

Likewise, science alone can not fully account the sustaining spiritual forces that lift man and culture beyond the limitations of practical necessity, adaptation and natural selection. When scientific method can no longer design a model to verify what the scientist suspects, he becomes a philosopher of sorts...that is when the scientific community considers that member to have gone "soft in the head"—a distinction which ironically includes most of the best and brightest of science.

See also
Max Scheler's concept of ressentiment
Ressentiment

References

Sources 
Scheler, Max, Formalism in Ethics and Non-Formal Ethics of Values. Trans. Manfred S. Frings and Roger L. Funk. Evanston: Northwestern University Press, 1973.
Scheler, Max, On the Eternal in Man. Trans. Bernard Noble. Hamden: Shoe String Press, 1972.
Scheler, Max, Man’s Place in Nature. Trans. Hans Meyerhoff. New York: Noonday, 1973.
Scheler, Max, The Nature of Sympathy. Trans. Peter Heath. Hamden: Shoe String Press, 1973.
Scheler, Max, Philosophical Perspectives. Trans. Manfred S. Frings. Boston: Beacon, 1958.
Scheler, Max, Problems of a Sociology of Knowledge. Trans. Manfred S Frings. Ed, Kenneth W. Stikkers. London: Routledge & Kegan Paul, Ltd., 1980. Hamden: Shoe String Press, 1972.
Scheler, Max, Ressentiment. Trans. William W. Holdheim. Introduction by Lewis A. Coser. New York: Schocken, 1972.
Scheler, Max, On the Eternal in Man. Trans. Bernard Noble. Hamden: Shoe String Press, 1972.
Scheler, Max, Selected Philosophical Essays. Trans. David R. Lachterman. “The Idols of Self-Knowledge,” “Ordo Amoris,” “Phenomenology and the Theory of Cognition,” “The Theory of Three Facts,” and “Idealism and Realism.” Evanston: Northwestern University Press, 1973.
Frings, Manfred S. Max Scheler: A Concise Introduction into the World of a Great Thinker. Milwaukee: Marquette University Press, 1996.
Frings, Manfred S. The Mind of Max Scheler: The First Comprehensive Guide Based on the Completed Works. Milwaukee: Marquette University Press, 2001.
Luther, Arthur R. “The Articulated Unity of Being in Scheler’s Phenomenology. Basic Drive and Spirit.”  Max Scheler (1874–1928) Centennial Essays, Ed. Manfred S. Frings. The Hague: Martinus Nijhoff, 1974.
Emad, Parvis. “Person, Death and World” Max Scheler (1874–1928) Centennial Essays, Ed. Manfred S. Frings. The Hague: Martinus Nijhoff, 1974).
Wojtyla, Karol (Pope John Paul II). The Acting Person. Trans. Potocki Andrzej. Boston: Kluwer, 1979.
Buttiglione, Rocco. Karol Wojtyla: The Thought of the Man who Became Pope John Paul II, trans. Paolo Guietti, Francesca Murphy. Wm. B. Eerdmans Publishing, 1997.
Welch, E. Parl. “Max Scheler’s Phenomenology of Religion.” Diss. University of Southern California, 1934.
Czopek, Michael J. “Max Scheler’s Problem of Religion: A Critical Exposition.” Diss. Chicago: DePaul University, 1981.

External links 
 Prof. Frings' Max Scheler website

 

Phenomenology
Emotion
Humanistic psychology
Axiology